The UEFA Euro 2016 qualifying Group A was one of the nine groups to decide which teams would qualify for the UEFA Euro 2016 finals tournament. Group A consisted of six teams: Netherlands, Czech Republic, Turkey, Latvia, Iceland, and Kazakhstan, where they played against each other home-and-away in a round-robin format.

The top two teams, Czech Republic and Iceland, qualified directly for the finals. Kazakhstan’s win over Latvia on the final day of matches, also allowed Turkey to qualify directly as the best ranked third-placed team of the qualifiers. As Turkey earned 6 points against Kazakhstan and 2 points against Latvia through their home and away fixtures, and as Kazakhstan’s win over Latvia ensured that Latvia would finish in last place in the group (rather than Kazakhstan), it then meant that only 2 (rather than 6) of Turkey’s total of 18 points earned would not count towards their third-placed ranking (as results against the team finishing in last place in the group were not included when ranking third-placed teams because one group had fewer teams than the others).

Standings

Matches 

The fixtures were released by UEFA the same day as the draw, which was held on 23 February 2014 in Nice. Times are CET/CEST, as listed by UEFA (local times are in parentheses).

Goalscorers

Discipline 
A player was automatically suspended for the next match for the following offences:
 Receiving a red card (red card suspensions could be extended for serious offences)
 Receiving three yellow cards in three different matches, as well as after fifth and any subsequent yellow card (yellow card suspensions were carried forward to the play-offs, but not the finals or any other future international matches)
The following suspensions were served during the qualifying matches:

Notes

References

External links 

UEFA Euro 2016 qualifying round Group A

Group A
2014–15 in Dutch football
2014–15 in Czech football
Q
2014 in Latvian football
2015 in Latvian football
2014 in Kazakhstani football
2015 in Kazakhstani football
2014 in Icelandic football
2015 in Icelandic football
2014–15 in Turkish football
Q
Q